The Paris Université Club plays baseball in Division Élite. They have been the most successful club in league history, sporting 22 titles. They won Bronze in the 1993 European Cup, the first French team to win a Medal in Cup history. They are a part of the omnisport club (PUC).

See also
Paris Université Club (rugby union)

References
 This article uses text from https://www.baseball-reference.com/bullpen/Paris_Universit%C3%A9_Club under the GFDL

External links
Official site

Division Élite teams
Sports clubs in Paris